Phytoecia collaris is a species of beetle in the family Cerambycidae. It was described by Francis Polkinghorne Pascoe in 1817, originally under the genus Blepisanis.

References

Phytoecia
Beetles described in 1817